Horsleyhope is a village in County Durham, England. It is situated a few miles to the south-west of Consett.

References

Villages in County Durham